Agnes Charlotte Gude (1 February 1863 – 11 July 1929) was a Norwegian watercolorist and illustrator.

Biography
Gude was born in Betws-y-Coed, Wales and raised in Karlsruhe and Berlin. Her parents were the prominent painter Hans Gude and Betsy Charlotte Juliane, née Anker (1830–1912). Under her siblings were the diplomat  (1853–1910), the painter Nils Gude (1859–1908) and the painter Sigrid Gude, married to the German sculptor Otto Lessing (1846–1912).

Gude was married to the German painter  (1860–1939) from 1885 to 1903. She had three children between 1886 and 1888. Her daughter  (1887–1979) also became an artist.

Gude received a good education in painting. She is known for several drawings, which are exhibited in the Norwegian National Gallery. However, only a few of her works are known. She illustrated a poetry collection of children's songs and rhymes edited by Mathilde Wesendonck, which was published in 1890. Twelve of her watercolors for this book were shown at the first Große Berliner Kunstausstellung in 1893. The depictions influenced by Art Nouveau belonged to the “splendid edition” of the children's book and became the property of her client Wesendonck.

Selected works 
 Alte und neue Kinder-Lieder und Reime. Gesammelt und gedichtet von Mathilde Wesendonck. Mit 15 Bildern und Initialen von A. Gude-Scholz. (Berlin 1890, 15 illustrations)

References
Notes

Sources
 Agnes Charlotte Gude (1986). In: Norsk kunstnerleksikon. Part II.
 Ebba Jansen: Slekten Gude i Norge. Bergen 1940. p. 88.

1863 births
1929 deaths
Watercolorists
Art Nouveau illustrators
19th-century Norwegian painters
20th-century Norwegian painters
Women watercolorists
Norwegian women painters
Norwegian women illustrators
19th-century Norwegian women artists
20th-century Norwegian women artists